U.S. Highway 30 (US 30) is part of the United States Numbered Highway System that runs for  from Astoria, Oregon to Atlantic City, New Jersey. This corridor was also highly traveled during Westward Expansion along the California and Oregon Trails, it was also used by the Pony Express and the Transcontinental Railroad. The landscape is dominated by vast agricultural fields within the fertile Platte River valley across the center of the state, while the western portion passes through higher plains and the eastern portion through the rolling hills adjacent to the Missouri River valley.

While US 30 has been mostly superseded by Interstate 80 for long-haul travel across the state, it has been a major thoroughfare across Nebraska since the early twentieth century, most notably as a central portion of the historic Lincoln Highway, an early transcontinental route from New York, New York to San Francisco, California that passed through Nebraska along the corridor that became US 30 once the route designations of the federal highway system were assigned in 1926. To showcase the historic importance of this early route across the state, the entire length of US 30 across Nebraska has been designated as the Lincoln Highway Scenic and Historic Byway, one of nine scenic byways designated by the Nebraska Department of Roads throughout the state.

Route description
U.S. Highway 30 enters Nebraska just east of Pine Bluffs, Wyoming.  It shares the first mile in Nebraska with Business Loop 80.  After passing through Bushnell, it enters Kimball, where it meets Old Highway 71 near the center of town. On the east side of Kimball, US 30 passes beneath the new Nebraska Highway 71 bypass with access provided via Link 53E.  It then continues east through Dix and Potter before meeting Nebraska Highway 19 west of Sidney.  It then passes through Sidney concurrent with Business Loop 80.  At the eastern end of Sidney, it meets U.S. Highway 385, and it remains concurrent with that highway through Lodgepole to Chappell.  U.S. 30 then runs straight east towards Ogallala, briefly running concurrently with Nebraska Highway 27, intersecting U.S. Highway 138 north of Big Springs, and passing through Brule.  After Brule, the highway is closely paralleled by the South Platte River to the south.  East of Ogallala, U.S. 30 passes through Paxton before meeting Nebraska Highway 25 in Sutherland.  After going through Hershey, it enters North Platte, where it meets U.S. Highway 83.  It then crosses over the North Platte River above where the North and South Platte Rivers meet to form the Platte River.

After leaving North Platte, U.S. 30 turns in a southeasterly direction on an alignment north of the Platte River.  It passes through Maxwell and Brady before entering Gothenburg, where it meets Nebraska Highway 47.  It continues southeast into Cozad, where it meets Nebraska Highway 21.  U.S. 30 and Highway 21 run concurrent into Lexington, where Highway 21 separates and U.S. 30 meets the northern end of U.S. Highway 283.  U.S. 30 continues southeast through Overton and meets U.S. Highway 183 at Elm Creek.  The highway turns east there and passes through Odessa before entering Kearney.  In Kearney, U.S. 30 meets Nebraska Highway 44, and east of the city passes under the new East Kearney Bypass which is the new alignment of Nebraska Highway 10. From there it continues on to Gibbon.  U.S. 30 passes through Gibbon, Shelton, Wood River (where it meets Nebraska Highway 11) and Alda before entering Grand Island, all of these on an alignment which generally goes northeasterly.

In Grand Island, U.S. Highway 30 intersects U.S. Highway 281 and Nebraska Highway 2 on the west side of Grand Island.  It goes through downtown Grand Island on a pair of one-way streets, then goes northeast towards Columbus through Chapman before entering Central City.  In Central City, U.S. 30 intersects Nebraska Highway 14.  The highway continues northeast towards Clarks, but meets Nebraska Highway 92 southwest of Clarks.  After Clarks, U.S. 30 meets Nebraska Highway 39 in Silver Creek.  After going through Duncan, U.S. 30 turns east and intersects U.S. Highway 81 south of Columbus.  The highway turns north with U.S. 81 to go into Columbus on a divided highway.  They separate in Columbus and U.S. 30 turns east.

U.S. 30 east of Columbus is a divided highway.  It goes east through Richland before changing into a freeway in the Schuyler area.  North of Schuyler, U.S. 30 has an interchange with Nebraska Highway 15.  U.S. 30 then becomes a two-lane highway east of Schuyler through Rogers and meets Nebraska Highway 79 in North Bend.  It continues east and becomes a divided highway in the Fremont area, serving as the Fremont bypass.  North of Fremont, U.S. 30 intersects U.S. Highway 77 and U.S. Highway 275, with U.S. 275 running concurrently around Fremont with U.S. 30.  East of Fremont, U.S. 30 continues east again, passing through Arlington before meeting Nebraska Highway 31.  U.S. 30 turns northeast, meeting Nebraska Highway 133 in a roundabout southwest of Blair.  In Blair, U.S. 30 then meets Nebraska Highway 91 and U.S. Highway 75, which runs concurrently with U.S. 30 in Blair.  U.S. 30 then leaves Blair, and then leaves Nebraska to enter Iowa via the Abraham Lincoln Memorial Bridge.

History
There were two previous alternate routes of US 30 in Nebraska.  U.S. Route 30S was the original route of US 30 in Nebraska.  When US 30 was realigned to go between Fremont and Missouri Valley, Iowa, US 30S was created to replace the old US 30 between Fremont and Omaha.  That route was decommissioned when US 275 was extended northwest from Council Bluffs, Iowa.  Part of that route is today's Nebraska Highway 64.  Later, U.S. Route 30A was created, which followed today's Nebraska Highway 92 east from Clarks to Omaha.  Both of these alternate routes went into Iowa at Omaha.

Major intersections

See also
U.S. Route 30
Interstate 80 in Nebraska

References

External links

The Nebraska Highways Page: Highways 1 to 30

U.S. Route 030 in Nebraska
30
 Nebraska
Transportation in Kimball County, Nebraska
Transportation in Cheyenne County, Nebraska
Transportation in Deuel County, Nebraska
Transportation in Keith County, Nebraska
Transportation in Lincoln County, Nebraska
Transportation in Dawson County, Nebraska
Transportation in Buffalo County, Nebraska
Transportation in Hall County, Nebraska
Transportation in Merrick County, Nebraska
Transportation in Platte County, Nebraska
Transportation in Colfax County, Nebraska
Transportation in Dodge County, Nebraska
Transportation in Washington County, Nebraska